ʻAbd al-Ṣabūr (ALA-LC romanization of ) is a male Muslim given name, built on the Arabic words ʻabd and al-Ṣabūr, one of the names of God in the Qur'an, which give rise to the Muslim theophoric names. It means "servant of the Patient One".

Because the Arabic letter corresponding to s is a sun letter, the letter l of the al- is assimilated to it. Thus although the name is written with letters corresponding to Abd al-Sabur, the usual pronunciation corresponds to Abd as-Sabur. Alternative transliterations include Abdul Saboor and others, all subject to variant spacing and hyphenation.

It may refer to
Salah Abdel Sabour (1931–1981), Egyptian poet.
Abdul Sabur Farid Kohistani (1952–2007), Prime Minister of Afghanistan
Abd'al Sabur, alias of Wadih el-Hage (born 1960), Lebanese imprisoned in the US for terrorist offences.
Abdul Saboor Qani

References

Arabic masculine given names